The term Professional student has two uses in the university setting:

In the United States and Canada, if not elsewhere, a professional student is a student majoring in what are considered the professional degrees.  These include Doctor of Education (Ed.D.), Doctor of Veterinary Medicine (D.V.M.), Law (J.D. or LL.B.), Dentistry (D.D.S. or D.M.D.), Medicine (M.D. or D.O.), Doctor of Physical Therapy (DPT), Engineering, Business Administration (M.B.A.), Nursing (B.Sc.N.), and Pharmacy (Pharm.D. or B.Sc.Phm.), as well as many others.
"Professional student" is a slang term commonly used in colleges to describe a student who stays in school for many years rather than embarking on a career. To avoid these types, some four-year colleges have imposed limits on the length of time students can be enrolled in order to open up their limited slots to new students.  However, those colleges allow for demonstrated exceptions (e.g., a student who holds down a full-time occupation or has a family to raise, who is clearly demonstrating progress toward a degree). See: perpetual student.
A less common meaning for "Professional student" is an individual who makes a living writing papers and doing college work in exchange for pay from other people.

Academic slang
University and college students
Student